Marcos Aguilar Vega (born 5 July 1972) is a Mexican politician affiliated with the PAN. He served as Deputy of the LXII Legislature of the Mexican Congress representing Querétaro.

Vega was born in Queretaro. His legislative committee responsibilities included the Commission for Regime, Regulations, and Parliamentary Practices, Constitutional Points, Jurisdictional, Budget and Public Account, and Oversight of the Superior Auditor of the Federation.

See also
 List of presidents of Querétaro Municipality

References

1972 births
Living people
People from Querétaro City
National Action Party (Mexico) politicians
21st-century Mexican politicians
Politicians from Querétaro
Members of the Congress of Querétaro
Autonomous University of Queretaro alumni
University of California, Santa Barbara faculty
Municipal presidents of Querétaro
Members of the Chamber of Deputies (Mexico) for Querétaro